The Food Chemicals Codex (FCC) is a collection of internationally recognized standards for the purity and identity of food ingredients.

Scope
The FCC features more than 1,250 monographs, including food-grade chemicals, processing aids, foods (such as vegetable oils, fructose, whey, and amino acids), flavoring agents, vitamins, and functional food ingredients (such as lycopene, olestra, and short chain fructooligosaccharides). The FCC also contains ingredients, such as sucrose and essential oils, that are not frequently found in other food additive standards resources.

The FCC provides essential criteria and analytical methods to authenticate and determine the quality of food ingredients. FCC standards are used as agreed standards between suppliers and manufacturers in ongoing purchasing and supply decisions and transactions. 

The FCC has two primary sections: monographs and appendices. Monographs are listed alphabetically and typically cover a single ingredient. Monographs, where applicable, provide information about each ingredient, such as:

Chemical structure
Chemical formula
Molecular weight
INS Number
CAS Registry Number
Function
Definition
Packaging
Storage
Labeling requirements
IR spectra

There are also several "family" monographs, which cover substance groups. These include "Enzyme Preparations," "Food Starch," and "Spice Oleoresins." Additionally, specifications are included, consisting of a series of tests, procedures for the tests, and acceptance criteria. Monographs may also detail USP Reference Standards and/or other materials needed for test performance. The FCC's appendices contain step-by-step guidance for general physical and chemical tests, and apparatus use, as well as generally useful information, such as food ingredient good manufacturing practices.

FCC standards are established, evaluated, and revised with scientific rigor in an open, collaborative process involving USP scientists, government representatives, expert volunteers, and public input. Standards are approved by an Expert Committee that includes knowledgeable technical leaders from industry, academia, and regulatory bodies from around the world.

History
The FCC has been published since 1966. 

Before 1960s, although the federal Food and Drug Administration (FDA) had by regulations and informal statements defined in general terms quality requirements for food chemicals generally recognized as safe (GRAS), these requirements were not published in the official regulations or designed to be sufficiently specific, therefore their use for general guidance was restricted.
For these and other reasons, the Food Protection Committee of the National Academy of Sciences-National Research Council received requests in 1958 from its Industry Liaison Panel and other sources to undertake a project designed to produce a Food Chemicals Codex comparable in many respects to the United States Pharmacopeia (USP) and the National Formulary (NF). In response to these requests, advice was sought from special committees composed of representatives of industry, government agencies, and others experienced in the operation of the USP and the NF. As a result, in 1966, This first edition of the FCC was published by the Institute of Medicine (IOM) for FDA.

USP acquired the FCC in 2006. USP started the online version of the FCC since 2008. The FCC is published every two years in print and online formats and is offered as a subscription that includes a main edition and intervening supplements. All proposed standards and revisions for the FCC are first posted in the free, online FCC Forum for a 90-day public comment period. As of May 2021, the FCC has been reprinted twelf times.

Editions

Latest edition (the twelfth edition)
FCC 12 has over 80 new and updated monographs compared to FCC 11.

More than 1,250 monographs including:

Probiotics & prebiotics
Flavors
Preservatives
Sweeteners
Fats and oils
Nutrients
Colorants
Infant formula ingredients

18 appendices, providing clear, step-by-step guidance for more than 150 tests and assays including:

Lead limit test
Food Fraud Mitigation Guidance
Guidance on Developing and Validating Non-Targeted Testing

First edition
The Food Protection Committee started in 1961 to provide objective quality standards for food-grade chemicals. Parts of the first edition were published in loose-leaf form between 1963 and 1966.

The scope of the first edition is limited to substances amenable to chemical characterization or biological standardization which are added directly to food to perform some desired function. Such substances were selected from food additives generally recognized as safe, those approved by prior sanctions, and those for which special use tolerances have been established by FDA regulations.

Second edition
This edition, slightly larger than the first, contains 639 monographs.

Third edition
The specifications in this edition of FCC were officially recognized not only by the FDA but also, under certain conditions, by the Canadian, Australian, New Zealand and UK authorities. This edition shows substantial differences in format from its 9-year-old predecessor, including much larger pages and two-column layout. The addition of 113 new monographs brings the total number to 776, covering over 800 substances. For the first time these include materials such as dextrose and fructose, more generally regarded as foods than as additives. Only one monograph, for aluminium sulphate solution, has been deleted because it appears to be no longer used in foods.

The monograph section previously entitled 'Specifications' has been changed to 'Requirements', and this also includes any identification tests that previously appeared under a 'Description' section.

Other changes in this edition are the inclusion for the first time of general Good Manufacturing Practices (GMP) guidelines for food chemicals, and the abandonment of a previous policy whereby the specifications for individual substances applied also to mixtures of the primary substance with additives such as anticaking agents, antioxidants and emulsifiers.

Fourth edition
Fifty-two new monographs are added to the third edition, making a total of 967 monographs.

In the course of the four editions, FCC has been expanded to include not only food additives, but also substances that come into contact with food and substances that are food (e.g. fructose and dextrose). However, three previous monographs have now been deleted (i.e. carrageenan, cinnamyl antranilate and methyl formate) due to altered circumstances and special emphasis is now placed on reducing contaminants, particularly lead.

Sixth edition
This edition was the first under USP's direction. This edition contains more than 1,000 monograph standards and tests to assure the identity, quality and purity of food ingredients.

Eighth edition
This authoritative edition provides:

More than 1,100 monographs, which include chemical formula and structure, chemical weight, function, definition, packaging and storage, labelling requirements, test procedures and more.
Fourteen appendices, which detail more than 150 tests and assays, with step-by-step guidance for the analysis of enzymes, impurities such as metals and pesticides and markers for authenticity testing, among others.
General information, which includes relevant information on a variety of topics including GMP Guidelines for Food Chemicals, a compare-and-contrast table of food and drug GMPs, a table of citations where the FCC has been incorporated by reference in the U.S. Code of Federal Regulations, AOAC International/International Organization for Standardization (ISO)/International Union of Pure and Applied Chemistry (IUPAC) method validation guidelines, and helpful introductions into a variety of different analytical test methods.

This edition also features for the first time the complete contents of USP's upcoming Food Fraud Database. The database features more than 1,300 entries on adulterants reported for specific ingredients and the corresponding analytical detection method. Based on scholarly manuscripts and media articles from 1980-2010, it serves as a baseline on fraud issues and can be a useful risk management tool for industry, regulators and other stakeholders.

Ninth edition
The ninth edition includes latest specifications for the identity and purity of about 1,200 food ingredients, including test methods and key guidance on critical issues.

Among the new monographs in the FCC is spirulina, a food ingredient that was just recently approved as a natural source of blue colour for candy and chewing gum by the US FDA. Formulators also use spirulina in specialty food bars, powdered nutritional drinks, among other products due to its non-animal protein content.

Another monograph included in this edition of FCC is brilliant black PN, a synthetic food colour used in products requiring the colour black in their formulation (jams, chocolate syrup and candy are common examples). Even though the FDA has not approved brilliant black PN as a food colour in the USA, its use in food is currently approved in many other countries.

Applications
The FCC is cited over 200 times in the U.S. Code of Federal Regulations and is recognized by regulatory bodies around the world including the US, Argentina, Australia, Brazil, Canada, Israel, New Zealand, Paraguay, and Uruguay.

Relations

JECFA
The FCC and standards from the Joint FAO/WHO Expert Committee on Food Additives (JEFCA) are both used throughout the world. The FCC is a more comprehensive compendium and includes ingredients that are not considered by JECFA. More specifically, the FCC is a compendium for all food ingredients, while JECFA considers only "food additives" for inclusion in its compendium. Examples of substances included in the FCC, but not in JECFA standards, are soybean oil, sucrose, fructose, and sodium chloride -- substances considered by JECFA to be foods or food ingredients, but not "food additives." Furthermore, the FCC considers for inclusion essential oils, functional food ingredients, and U.S. GRAS-Notified and GRAS-self-determined ingredients. The broader range of ingredients encompassed by the FCC generates a compendium for the food industry that is often considered more complete and more useful.

GRAS
As a list of food substances not requiring a formal premarket review by FDA to assure their safety, GRAS list is directly regulated and updated by FDA.By 1997 FDA had tentatively concluded that it could no longer devote substantial resources to the GRAS affirmation petition process. As a result, FDA launched the GRAS Notification Program so as to update the list. FCC standards are reviewed and approved by independent experts. All proposed standards and revisions for the FCC are first posted in the free, online FCC Forum for a 90-day public comment period.

See also
Codex Alimentarius
Food additive
Federal Food, Drug, and Cosmetic Act
Food Additives Amendment of 1958
FDA Food Safety Modernization Act
Generally recognized as safe
Joint FAO/WHO Expert Committee on Food Additives

References

External links
 USP | food safety
 FDA | food ingredients
 EU legislation on food additives
 JECFA | WHO

Food chemistry